Jay Turner was an American cinematographer who worked in Hollywood primarily during the 1920s. He frequently collaborated with actor-director Lupino Lane.

Biography 
Jay was born in Martinsville, Indiana, to Harry Turner and Sophinda Williams. The family relocated to Los Angeles when Jay was young, and by 1920, he was working at a film studio as a cameraman. He married Katherine Potter in 1924. His last known project as cinematographer was 1929's Battling Sisters. After that, he appears to have become the building manager for a Hollywood apartment building owned by Lupino Lane.

Selected filmography 

 Battling Sisters (1929)
 Good Night Nurse (1929)
 Howling Hollywood (1929)
 Be My King (1928)
 Roaming Romeo (1928)
 Fandango (1928)
 Sword Points (1928)
 Hello Sailor (1927)
 From a Cabby's Seat (1926)
 Darwin Was Right (1924)
 A Friendly Husband (1923)

References 

American cinematographers
1960 deaths
1896 births
People from Martinsville, Indiana